George Harwell Bond (1891–1952) was an architect active in Atlanta, Georgia and worked at the firm of G. Lloyd Preacher.

He designed the modernist Briarcliff Plaza shopping center (1939) in the Poncey-Highland neighborhood, the Plaza Theatre and Atlanta's first shopping center with off-street parking.

He also designed the Second Ponce de Leon Baptist Church (1937) at "Jesus Junction" in Buckhead.

References

1891 births
1952 deaths
20th-century American architects
Architects from Georgia (U.S. state)